Block C (eSibayeni) is a village under  Siboshwa Tribal Authority in the Nkomazi Local Municipality, Ehlanzeni District Municipality, Mpumalanga, South Africa. Its nearest town is Komatipoort. It is separated from Kamaqhekeza(Naas) township by the R571 Mananga road. It has an 8-hr PHC clinic, 5 primary schools, 2 combined schools, 2 secondary schools, 2 filling stations and 1 big shopping complex.

There is a significant number of immigrants from  Mozambique and eSwatini. The place is located 30 km from Lebombo Border of Mozambique and 33 km from Mananga of eSwatini via R571.
Notable people who come from there include Jomo Nyambi a South African parliamentarian, John Hlaluku (Actor, Politician, film director & artist) and Princess Indlovukazi of My Dali fame. Well-known families in the village include Msimango, Masuku, Mabila, Ntimane, Nkalanga & Ngomane (chief).

The village has grown and developed since the early days of apartheid. It is divided into Makhulu Standi, Sebokeng, Jabulani, Loss My Cherry, Manyeleti, Dindela & Phakama A, B, C sections. It is home to SiSwati language at about 75%, 24% Shangaan(Moz) & 1% other.

Populated places in the Nkomazi Local Municipality
Townships in Mpumalanga